The San Nicolas de Tolentino Parish Church is a Roman Catholic parish church located in the municipality of San Nicolas, Ilocos Norte. Exhibiting a baroque façade, the church bears the Spanish coat of arms. A three-storey belltower on its right was built by Father Vitoriano Garcia.

History
San Nicolas Church was first constructed in 1584, the same year the town was founded by the Augustinian friars. The town then was named Visita de Caluntian because of the abundant lanuti tree in the area. The church was reconstructed in 1693 by Father Antonio Villanueva.

References

Roman Catholic churches in Ilocos Norte
Baroque architecture in the Philippines
Churches in the Roman Catholic Diocese of Laoag